The United States Men's Under-19 National Floorball Team is the men's under-19 national floorball team of the United States, and a member of the International Floorball Federation. The team is composed of the best American floorball players under the age of 19. The United States' under-19 men's team is currently ranked 14th in the world at floorball, and played in the B-Division at the most recent U-19 World Floorball Championships.

The United States National Team is organized by USA Floorball.

Roster 
The roster of Team USA at the 2019 U-19 WFC.

As of June 27, 2019

Team Staff 
Head Coach - Joel Olofsson 

General Manager - Kenton Walker 

Coach - Lars Halvardsson 

Coach - Patrick Jesue 

Athletic Trainer - Sean Edin 

Staff - Geoff Dugan 

Staff - Jerker Eriksson

Records

All-Time World Championship Records

Head-to-Head International Records

References

External links 
 Official website

United States floorball teams
Men's national floorball teams